News-Press may refer to:
Santa Barbara News-Press, Santa Barbara, California
The News-Press, Fort Myers, Florida, owned by Gannet/USA Today
Falls Church News-Press, Falls Church Virginia
News-Press & Gazette Company, media company in St. Joseph, Missouri
St. Joseph News-Press, newspaper in St. Joseph, Missouri

News Press may refer to:
NewsPress, Stillwater, Oklahoma
Shoshone News Press, Shoshone County, Idaho